The Center for Computer-Assisted Legal Instruction, also known as CALI, is a 501(c)(3) nonprofit that does research and development in online legal education. CALI publishes over 1,200 interactive tutorials, free casebooks, and develops software for experiential learning. Over 90% of US law schools are members which provide students with unlimited and free access to these materials.

CALI was incorporated in 1982 in the state of Minnesota by the University of Minnesota Law School and Harvard Law School. The cost of membership to CALI is US$8,000 per year for US law schools; free for legal-aid organizations, library schools, state and county law librarians; and US$250 per year for law firms, paralegal programs, undergraduate departments, government agencies, individuals, and other organizations.

Services

CALI Lessons
CALI Lessons are interactive tutorials written by law faculty covering various law study material in 20–40 minute lessons.

CALIcon Conference
CALI's CALIcon is a two-day conference where faculty, law librarians, tech staff and educational technologists gather to share ideas, experiences and expertise. Exhibitors have included legal and education researchers as well as law companies.

CALI first hosted The Conference for Law School Computing in 1991 (then known as the Conference for Law School Computing Professionals) at Chicago-Kent. From 1991 to 1994 the conference was hosted at Chicago-Kent, and since 1995 the conference has been hosted on-site by various CALI member law schools.

References

External links
 CALI's website

Legal research
Charities based in Minnesota
Legal education in the United States
Organizations established in 1982
Harvard Law School
1982 establishments in Minnesota